Zheng Kewei (born January 21, 1980, in Zhabei, Shanghai) is a Chinese footballer who plays as a midfielder.

Club career
Zheng Kewei started his career playing for Shanghai Shenhua in the 2000 league season, where despite having already established Chinese internationals Shen Si and Qi Hong in front of him in midfield, Zheng would soon go on to establish himself as the club's first choice midfielder by the end of the 2001 league season. During his time with the club, he won the last Chinese Jia-A League league title in 2003 before it was renamed as the Chinese Super League. Unfortunately in 2013 the Chinese Football Association would revoke the league title after it was discovered the Shenhua General manager Lou Shifang had bribed officials to be bias to Shenhua in games that season. After years of loyal service, which saw the club just miss out on another league title the club would merge with local rivals Shanghai United F.C. and with the significantly large squad Zheng was allowed to be loaned out.

At the beginning of the 2009 league season, Shanghai Shenhua announced Zheng would officially join second-tier club Nanchang Bayi on a one-year loan deal. The move would be a big success and Zheng would play a vital part in the team's promotion to the top tier in his first season. After his successful season with Nanchang he would have his loan extended for another year and help guide the club avoid relegation. With his loan finished and his contract with Shenhua ended Zheng would move on a free transfer to Hangzhou Greentown where he was reunited with his former manager at Shenhua, Wu Jingui.

Club career stats
Correct as of 1 Jan 2012

Honours
Shanghai Shenhua
 Chinese Jia-A League: 2003 (revoked due to match-fixing scandal)

References

External links
 Zheng Kewei's Database on Sohu.com

1980 births
Living people
Chinese footballers
Footballers from Shanghai
Shanghai Shenhua F.C. players
Shanghai Shenxin F.C. players
Zhejiang Professional F.C. players
Chinese Super League players
China League One players
Association football midfielders
Shanghai Shenhua F.C. non-playing staff